Zdobnice is a municipality and village in Rychnov nad Kněžnou District in the Hradec Králové Region of the Czech Republic. It has about 200 inhabitants. The hamlet of Kačerov within the municipality is well preserved and is protected by law as a village monument zone.

Geography
It lies in the Orlické Mountains. The Zdobnice River flows through the municipality.

Sport
Zdobnice is a small ski resort with three ski lifts.

References

Villages in Rychnov nad Kněžnou District